The Jordan national basketball team is the official basketball team of Jordan in international competitions.

The Jordanian team achievements in recent years beside qualifying to World Cup for three times (2010, 2019 and 2023), won the William Jones Cup in 2007 and 2008 and FIBA Asia Stankovic cup in Kuwait in 2008, finishing at the first place of Arab Nations cup in Egypt in 2007, and runners up in 2008, runners up at 2011 FIBA Asia Championship and 3rd place in 2009 FIBA Asia Championship, and finally 3rd place in 2016 FIBA Asia Challenge.

Jordan qualified for FIBA World Cup three times in history, making them the third best Arab team by National team appearances in the FIBA Basketball World Cup.

History

William Jones Cup
Jordan became the first West Asia team to win the Jones Cup after posting a 7–2 record in the tournament to beat Lebanon and the Philippines.

2007 FIBA Asia championship
The Jordanians placed fifth after beating Chinese Taipei. A member of the University of Minnesota basketball team, guard/forward Jamal Abu-Shamala, is Jordanian-American.

Honours
 2021
1st Place: King Abdullah II Basketball Cup

 2016
3rd place: FIBA Asia Challenge Cup.

 2014
West Asian Championship: 1st

 2011
2nd Place: FIBA Asia Championship in China.
1st Place: King Abdullah II Basketball Cup
2nd Place: West Asia Basketball Cup in Iraq.
2nd place : Arab games

 2009
2nd Place: Qatar International Tournament.
2nd Place: William Jones Cup.
3rd Place: FIBA Asia Championship in China.

 2008 
1st Place: FIBA Asia Stankovic Cup.
2nd Place: Arab Basketball Cup in Tunisia.
1st Place: Qatar Friendly Tournament.
1st Place: William Jones Basketball Cup in Taiwan.
2nd Place: West Asia Basketball Cup in Jordan.

 2007 
1st Place: William Jones Basketball Cup in Taiwan.
1st Place: Arab Basketball Cup in Egypt.
2nd Place: Pan Arab Games in Egypt.
1st Place: King Abdullah II Basketball Cup.

 2006 
3rd Place: King Abdullah II Basketball Cup.

 2005 
2nd Place: West Asian Games – Basketball.

 2004  
1st Place: King Abdullah II Basketball Cup.
1st Place: Qatar International Basketball Cup.

 2002 
2nd Place: King Abdullah II Basketball Cup.

 1999 
2nd Place: 9th Pan Arab Games in Jordan.

 1992 
2nd Place: 7th Pan Arab Games in Syria.

 1987 
1st Place: Military Tournament in the UAE.

 1985 
1st Place: Pan Arab Games in Morocco.

Results

World Cup

FIBA Asia Cup

Pan Arab Games

1953: 
1957–1976: ?
1985: 
1992: 
1997: ?
1999: 
2004: ?
2007: 
2011:

Team

Current roster

2021 FIBA Asia Cup qualification
Opposition: Sri Lanka (21 February)
Venue: Prince Hamza, Amman
Opposition: Kazakhstan (24 February)
Venue: Jekpe-Jek Saraiy, Nur-Sultan

Past roster
Roster for the 2019 FIBA Basketball World Cup.

Head coaches
  Tab Baldwin (2011–2012)
  Zaid Alkhas (2018–2019)
  Joseph Anthony Stiebing (2019–)

References

External links
Official website
FIBA profile

 
Men's national basketball teams
Basketball